For information on all College of the Holy Cross sports, see Holy Cross Crusaders

The Holy Cross Crusaders baseball team is a varsity intercollegiate athletic team of the College of the Holy Cross in Worcester, Massachusetts, United States. The team is a member of the Patriot League, which is part of the National Collegiate Athletic Association's Division I. The team plays its home games at Hanover Insurance Park at Hanover Insurance Park at Fitton Field in Worcester, Massachusetts. The Crusaders are coached by Ed Kahovec. Holy Cross has participated in the NCAA Tournament 11 times and has advanced to the College World Series on four occasions, capturing the title in 1952. The team earned its first Patriot League regular season title in 2013 before falling in the Patriot League Championship Series for the third time in four years. The team also boasts recent wins over top 10 teams, defeating #4 Texas A&M in 2012 and #7 Mississippi State in 2014.

In 2017, the team won its first Patriot League Tournament Championship by sweeping Army and Bucknell. It was the fifth PLCS appearance for the Crusaders in eight years.
The Crusaders have had 32 players selected by Major League teams in the MLB Draft, most recently Nick Lovullo (Boston Red Sox, 2016), Brendan King (Chicago Cubs, 2017), and Declan Cronin (Chicago White Sox, 2019).

NCAA tournament

The Crusaders have participated in the NCAA Tournament on 11 occasions and have advanced to the College World Series four times, winning in 1952.

College World Series Most Outstanding Player

1952–James O'Neill

Awards and honors

NCAA 
All-American

 Jim Sweeney (3rd Team), 1999

Academic All-American

 Nick DeAngelis (2nd Team), 1970
 Bill Doran (2nd Team), 1976
 Ron Perry (1st Team), 1978-1980
 Todd Dextradeur (1st Team), 1990
 Tom Miller (2nd Team), 1991
 Gerard Lambert (3rd Team), 1991-1992
 Paige Brennan (2nd Team), 1993; (3rd Team), 1994

Freshman All-American

 Austin Masel, 2017
Ben Dellacono, 2020

Patriot League 
Patriot League Player of the Year

 Jim Sweeney, 1999
 Peter Summa, 2001
 Matt Perry, 2009
 Jordan Enos, 2013

Patriot League Pitcher of the Year

 Matt Shapiro, 2008
 John Colella, 2013

Patriot League Rookie of the Year

 Tyler Stampone, 2006
 Stephen Wadsworth, 2010
 Cam O'Neill, 2015
 Austin Masel, 2017

Patriot League All-Decade Team

 Terrence Butt, 1990s

Patriot League 25th Anniversary Team (2015)

 John Colella
 Matt Perry
 Jim Sweeney

Patriot League Outstanding Leadership & Character Award

 Declan Cronin, 2019

See also
1952 Holy Cross Crusaders baseball team
1952 College World Series
Jack Barry
List of NCAA Division I baseball programs

References

External links
 

 
1876 establishments in Massachusetts
Baseball teams established in 1876